Wellington—Dufferin—Simcoe was a federal electoral district represented in the House of Commons of Canada from 1979 to 1988. It was located in the province of Ontario. This riding was created in 1976 as Dufferin—Wellington and renamed in 1977. It was created from parts of Halton, Peel—Dufferin—Simcoe and Wellington—Grey—Dufferin—Waterloo ridings.

It consisted of the County of Dufferin, the Townships of Adjala and Tosorontio and the Town of Alliston in the County of Simcoe, and Townships of Arthur, Erin, Maryborough, Minto, Nichol, Peel, West Garafraxa and West Luther, including the Towns of Mount Forest and Palmerston in the County of Wellington.

The electoral district was abolished in 1987 when it was redistributed between Guelph—Wellington, Perth—Wellington—Waterloo, Simcoe Centre, Wellington—Grey—Dufferin—Simcoe and York—Simcoe ridings.

Members of Parliament

This riding has elected the following Members of Parliament:

Election results

|-
  
|Progressive Conservative
|Perrin Beatty
|align="right"|25,807
  
|Liberal
|Harry A. Greene  
|align="right"| 11,202 
 
|New Democratic
|Jeff Koechlin 
|align="right"| 4,744    
|}

|- 
  
|Progressive Conservative
|Perrin Beatty 
|align="right"|21,205 
  
|Liberal
|Larry Davies 
|align="right"|12,104 
 
|New Democratic
| Cecil Chambers 
|align="right"| 5,966   

|}

|- 
  
|Progressive Conservative
|Perrin Beatty
|align="right"| 29,983
  
|Liberal
|John Green 
|align="right"| 7,303 
 
|New Democratic
|Sandy W. A. Young 
|align="right"| 6,468   
|}

See also 

 List of Canadian federal electoral districts
 Past Canadian electoral districts

External links 

 Website of the Parliament of Canada

Former federal electoral districts of Ontario